Serbia competed at the 2013 Summer Universiade in Kazan, Russia from 6 to 17 July 2013, and won 9 medals.

Medalists

Athletics 

Field events

Badminton 

Men

Women

Mixed

Basketball

Men's tournament 

|}

Quarterfinal

Semifinal

Bronze-medal game

Canoeing 

Men

Legend: QF = Qualified for Final; QS = Qualified for Semifinal

Women

Legend: QF = Qualified for Final; QS = Qualified for Semifinal

Chess 

Men

Women

Mixed

Judo 

Men

Repechage rounds

Sambo 

Men

Women

Shooting 

Men

Women

Swimming 

Men

Women

Water polo 

Preliminary round

Quarterfinal

Semifinal

Bronze-medal match

Weightlifting 

Women

Wrestling 

Greco-Roman

Freestyle

External links 
 Serbia at the 2013 Summer Universiade

Nations at the 2013 Summer Universiade
2
Univ